

Awards

FIBA European Champions Cup Finals Top Scorer
 J.A. San Epifanio "Epi" ( FC Barcelona)

External links
FIBA European Champions Cup 1983–84

1983–84 in European basketball
1983–84
1985 in Swiss sport
1983–84 in Italian basketball
1983–84 in Spanish basketball
International basketball competitions hosted by Switzerland
FC Barcelona Bàsquet games